The 2002 Superbike World Championship was the fifteenth FIM Superbike World Championship season. The season started on 2 March at Valencia and finished on 29 September at Imola after 13 rounds.

Colin Edwards won his second championship in what has been hailed as one of the most impressive comebacks in the history of motorcycle racing. The season started with Troy Bayliss winning the first six races and by the end of race 1 at Mazda Raceway Laguna Seca he had 14 wins and was leading the championship by 58 points. Race 2 at Laguna Seca was the start of Colin Edwards' comeback, he went on to win all nine remaining races and combined with a race 2 crash for Bayliss at Assen Edwards won the championship at the final race of the season at Imola. The final race of the season saw both riders fighting wheel to wheel for the entire race. The race is known to fans as the "Showdown at Imola".

The manufacturers' championship was won by Ducati.

Race calendar and results

Championship standings

Riders' standings

Manufacturers' standings

Entry list

References

Superbike World Championship
Superbike World Championship seasons